The Blackburne Thrush was a 1,500 cc three-cylinder radial aero-engine for light aircraft produced by Burney and Blackburne Limited. Burney and Blackburne were based at Bookham, Surrey, England and was a former motorcycle manufacturer.

First produced in 1926 the engine was based on an earlier 1924 design with improvements to allow use on light aircraft.

Applications
 ANEC IV
 Blackburn Bluebird
 Clarke Cheetah
 Cranwell CLA.4
 Parnall Pixie
 Supermarine Sparrow
 Vickers Vagabond
 Westland Widgeon

Specifications (Thrush)

See also

References

Notes

Bibliography

 Lumsden, Alec. British Piston Engines and their Aircraft. Marlborough, Wiltshire: Airlife Publishing, 2003. .

External links

 Flight, 7 January 1926 - The Blackburne "Thrush" Light 'plane engine

Aircraft air-cooled radial piston engines
Blackburne aircraft engines
1920s aircraft piston engines